During the 1987–88 English football season, Queens Park Rangers competed in the First Division for the fifth season after their promotion in 1983.

Season summary
Jim Smith led QPR to fifth place in the First Division, matching their position in the 1983–84 season. They had led the table in October after winning eight of their first ten League matches. They suffered a surprise defeat to Bury in the third round of the League Cup and reached the fifth round of the FA Cup.

League table

Results
Queens Park Rangers' score comes first

Football League First Division

FA Cup

League Cup

Squad
Squad at end of season

Left club during season

References

Queens Park Rangers F.C. seasons
Queens Park Rangers